Meesha Madhavan is a 2002 Indian Malayalam-language action comedy film directed by Lal Jose and written by Ranjan Pramod. The film stars Dileep in the title role, while Kavya Madhavan, Indrajith Sukumaran, Jagathy Sreekumar, Harisree Asokan and Cochin Haneefa play supporting roles. It was the highest-grossing Malayalam film of the year. Meesha Madhavan raised Dileep's stardom to a whole new level and developed a cult following in Malayalam cinema. It was remade in Telugu as Dongodu (2003) starring Ravi Teja and in Kannada as Hori (2010) starring Vinod Prabhakar and in Tamil as Kollaikaran starring Vidharth.

Plot
 
Madhavan  is a clever thief who robs for a living and is well known in the village. He is following the principles of his mentor Mullani Pappan  who trained him to be a thief when Madhavan was a young boy. Meesa Madhavan got his name by the popular saying that if Madhavan rolls his Moustache (Meesa in Malayalam) looking at someone, he will rob his house that night.

His enemy is the local money lender Bhageerathan Pillai who refuses to give back his father's property despite Madhavan paying back the loan with interest years ago. Madhavan falls in love with Bhageerathan Pillai's daughter Rukmini. Despite being childhood friends, in the beginning of the movie Rukmini hates Madhavan as he is a well known thief in the locality.

But later on when she realizes that Madhavan's sisters marriage was cancelled because of her father, she slowly started falling for him and later both fall in love with each other. The sub inspector in the village Eappen Pappachi has an eye on Rukmini.

Eappan steals the idol from the local Temple with the intention of selling it and puts the blame on Madhavan. It becomes Madhavan's responsibility to find the culprits and he does that with his mentor's help and thus uniting with his girl friend, with the blessing of her father, Bhageerathan Pillai.

Cast

Soundtrack

The music album of Meesa Madhavan happens to be one of the most popular works of Vidyasagar. The lyrics were written by Gireesh Puthenchery. A part of the song "Karimizhi Kuruviye" was reused in "Aasai Aasai Ippoluthu" in Dhool.

Reception 
The film was commercial success at the box office  and became the highest-grossing Malayalam film of 2002. It had completed 250 days in theatres.

References

External links
 

2000s Malayalam-language films
2002 romantic comedy films
Indian romantic comedy films
Indian action comedy films
2002 films
Malayalam films remade in other languages
Films shot in Palakkad
Films shot in Ottapalam
Films scored by Vidyasagar
Films directed by Lal Jose